Charlie Sutton (3 April 1924 – 5 June 2012) was an Australian rules footballer who represented  in the Victorian Football League (VFL).

Although he served the club for many years as coach and committee man, he is perhaps best known for captaining the Bulldogs to their first VFL premiership in 1954.

Recruited from Spotswood, Sutton was a tough, nuggety footballer who embodied the club's fighting spirit. He played as a rover and half forward, but it was as a back pocket player that he made his name. In 1950, he finished equal third in the Brownlow Medal count and won the Con Weickhardt Trophy (as it was then known) as the Bulldogs' best and fairest player that season.

He was captain-coach of the team from 1951 to 1955.

After his retirement as a player, Sutton coached Footscray from 1956 until 9 July 1957, when he was unceremoniously dismissed and replaced by Ted Whitten. Sutton later returned to coach Footscray in 1967 (replacing Ted Whitten) and 1968 (after which he resigned having decided that the ever-increasing demands of coaching clashed far too much with his business of running a hotel at Yarraville).

In 1978 Sutton took over the position of President of the Footscray Football Club when Dick Collinson resigned.

He has the Western Bulldogs best and fairest award, the Charles Sutton Medal, named in his honour.

In 1996 Sutton was inducted into the Australian Football Hall of Fame. Sutton died in 2012 at the age of 88.

References

Bibliography
 Ross, J. (ed), 100 Years of Australian Football 1897–1996: The Complete Story of the AFL, All the Big Stories, All the Great Pictures, All the Champions, Every AFL Season Reported, Viking, (Ringwood), 1996. 
 Ross, J. (ed), The Australian Football Hall of Fame, HarperCollinsPublishers, (Pymble), 1999.

External links
 
 
 

Western Bulldogs players
Western Bulldogs Premiership players
Australian rules footballers from Victoria (Australia)
Western Bulldogs coaches
Western Bulldogs Premiership coaches
Australian Football Hall of Fame inductees
Charles Sutton Medal winners
Spotswood Football Club players
1924 births
2012 deaths
One-time VFL/AFL Premiership players
One-time VFL/AFL Premiership coaches